William Jones (born 14 February 1931) is an Australian sprint canoer who competed in the late 1950s. At the 1956 Summer Olympics in Melbourne, he finished fifth in the C-2 1000 m and  seventh in the C-2 10000 m event.

References
William Jones' profile at Sports Reference.com

External links
 

1931 births
Australian male canoeists
Canoeists at the 1956 Summer Olympics
Olympic canoeists of Australia
Possibly living people
20th-century Australian people